Ribociclib, sold under the brand name Kisqali and Kryxana marketed by Novartis, is an inhibitor of cyclin D1/CDK4 and CDK6, and is used for the treatment of certain kinds of breast cancer. Ribociclib is a kinase inhibitor indicated in combination with: an aromatase inhibitor for the treatment of pre/perimenopausal or postmenopausal women with hormone receptor (HR)-positive, human epidermal growth factor receptor 2 (HER2)-negative advanced or metastatic breast cancer, as initial endocrine-based therapy; or fulvestrant for the treatment of postmenopausal women with HR-positive, HER2-negative advanced or metastatic breast cancer, as initial endocrine-based therapy or following disease progression on endocrine therapy. It is also being studied as a treatment for other drug-resistant cancers. It was developed by Novartis and Astex Pharmaceuticals. Ribociclib is currently the only CDK4/6 inhibitor with a proven benefit on overall survival across all three Phase III trials of the MONALEESA clinical program with different endocrine therapy partners, regardless of menopausal status or line of therapy. The European Society of Medical Oncology (ESMO) assigned the highest score on the 'Magnitude of Clinical Benefit Scale' for Kisqali.

Medical uses
Ribociclib was approved by the U.S. Food and Drug Administration (FDA) in March 2017. It was approved by the European Medicines Agency (EMA) in August 2017. It was approved for use in the NHS by NICE in February 2021. It can be used in combination with an aromatase inhibitor (such as letrozole) to treat HR-positive, HER2-negative advanced or metastatic breast cancers.

In the clinical trial relevant for the drug's approval, ribociclib significantly improved progression-free survival (PFS), that is, the time span the cancer did not get worse. For patients receiving placebo plus letrozole, PFS was 16 months on average, while under ribociclib plus letrozole, PFS was 25 months as of the January 2017 analysis. The study is scheduled to run until September 2020.

Side effects
The most common side effects in studies were decreased blood cell counts, mainly neutropenia (in 75% of patients, as compared to 5% under placebo), but also anemia (18% vs. 5%). Gastrointestinal disorders were also common, for example nausea (52% vs. 29%) and diarrhea (35% vs. 22%), as was alopecia (33% vs. 16%). The drug also increases the QT interval and liver enzymes (alanine transaminase, aspartate transaminase).

Interactions 

As ribociclib is mainly metabolized by the liver enzyme CYP3A4, inhibitors of this enzyme increase its concentrations in the body and could potentiate side effects and toxicity. Examples of such inhibitors include ketoconazole and similar antifungal drugs, ritonavir, clarithromycin, as well as grapefruit. Conversely, drugs that induce CYP3A4, such as rifampicin and St John's Wort, can decrease ribociclib concentrations.

Ribociclib itself is a moderate to strong CYP3A4 inhibitor and therefore can increase concentrations of other drugs that share this metabolism, as has been shown with midazolam. It also inhibits a number of transporter proteins and could thus theoretically interfere with the transport of other drugs in the body. It could also amplify QT prolongation of other drugs such as antiarrhythmics, clarithromycin, and haloperidol.

Pharmacology

Mechanism of action

Cyclin-dependent kinases (CDKs) 4 and 6 are enzymes that have been shown to promote cell division and multiplication in both normal and cancer cells. Many cancer cells have shown abnormalities that increase the activity of CDK, leading to the inactivation of certain tumor suppressor genes.

When used in combination with other drugs such as an ALK or an MEK inhibitor, ribociclib has been shown to have a synergistic effect, resulting in improved responses. Again, this is likely a result of "crosstalk" between signaling pathways. Simply blocking one pathway in cancer tumorigenesis can sometimes result in "tumor compensation", where the tumor compensates for the blocked signaling pathway by utilizing other pathways to survive. By blocking several pathways at once, it is thought that the tumor is less able to compensate, and a greater anti-tumor response is often observed. Utilizing ribociclib in combination with other agents has been shown to reduce the development of resistance to these agents. In other words, cancer's development of drug resistance can be mitigated with the addition of ribociclib to the therapeutic regime.

Pharmacokinetics
The percentage of ribociclib absorbed in the gut has not been determined. Highest blood plasma levels are reached after one to four hours; and after repeated dosage, steady state concentrations are reached after about eight days. Food intake has no effect on absorption rates. When in the bloodstream, about 70% of ribociclib is bound to plasma proteins.

The substance is mainly metabolized by CYP3A4 and subsequently by various phase II enzymes, resulting in a large number of metabolites. Those with highest blood plasma concentrations in humans are called CCI284 (an unspecified N-hydroxylation product), LEQ803 (the N-demethylation product) and M1 (a glucuronide). All metabolites have negligible clinical activity.

Ribociclib has a slight tendency to accumulate in the body. It is eliminated with an average biological half-life of 32 hours, mostly (69%) via the feces, but also (23%) via the urine. The unchanged drug accounts for 17% of the substance in the feces and 12% of the substance in the urine, the rest being metabolites.

Research

, ribociclib is in phase II development for several indications, including liposarcoma, endometrial carcinoma and neuroendocrine tumors of the foregut.

Chemistry
Ribociclib is used in form of its tartrate salt. It is a slightly hygroscopic yellow to brown crystalline powder that is soluble in aqueous acids.

See also 
Palbociclib, a drug with similar mechanism and indications

References

External links 
 
 

Protein kinase inhibitors
Carboxamides
CYP3A4 inhibitors
Pyridines
Novartis brands
Pyrimidines
Piperazines
Cyclopentanes